Daenikera corallina is a plant parasite species in the Santalaceae family. It is endemic to New Caledonia and the only species of the genus Daenikera. Its closest relative is Amphorogyne, also endemic to New Caledonia.

References

Endemic flora of New Caledonia
Santalaceae
Monotypic Santalales genera